Venkatapuram also known as Nugur Venkatapuram is a mandal in Jayashankar Bhupalpally district of Telangana, India. Previously, Venkatapuram used to be in Nugur Tehsil or Taluka of East Godavari District of Andhra Pradesh.

Demographics
According to Indian census, 2011, the demographic details of Venkatapuram mandal is as follows:
 Total Population: 	31,765	
 Male Population: 	15,384	and Female Population: 	16,381
 Total Literates: 	16,984

Villages
The villages in Venkatapuram mandal include:
 Alubaka 	
 Barlagudem 	
 Edhira 	
 Marikala 	
 Morravarigudem 	
 Pathrapuram 	
 Suraveedu 	
 Veerabhadravaram
 Chokkala
 Tekulaboru
 Wadagudem
 Nugur
UppeduVeerapuram

References

Mandals in Jayashankar Bhupalpally district